Trinity Western University (TWU) is a private Christian liberal arts university with campuses in both Langley and Richmond, British Columbia. The school is a member of Universities Canada.

TWU was established in 1962 and enrolls approximately 5,000 students with a suburban-rural  campus in Langley. Trinity Western is Canada's largest privately funded Christian university with a broad-based liberal arts, sciences, and professional studies curriculum, offering 45 undergraduate majors and 17 graduate and post-graduate programs. In the classroom, TWU has 16:1 student-faculty ratio, average first-year class size of 37, and overall average class size of 15.

Trinity Western is a member of the Royal Society of Canada. Its varsity teams, known as the Spartans, are members of U Sports. According to Universities Canada, the non-profit national organization that represents Canadian universities and colleges, TWU's domestic tuition is the most expensive of any university in Canada.

History
Trinity Western University traces its history back to 1957, when a committee was established by the Evangelical Free Church of America to study and consider the feasibility of a liberal arts college on North America's Pacific Coast. The committee decided on a location between Vancouver and Seattle in rural British Columbia, in what is now the Township of Langley. 
Trinity Junior College began as a two-year college in 1962, and its name was changed to Trinity Western College 10 years later, following a significant period of growth in enrollment and program options. After 20 years as a transfer college, Trinity Western began awarding baccalaureate degrees in 1980.  
In 1985 the British Columbia Provincial Government legislated the institution to its current position as a privately funded Christian university and it became known as Trinity Western University. It is the fourth-oldest university in the province of British Columbia after the University of British Columbia, the University of Victoria, and Emily Carr University of Art and Design.

Insignia and symbols

Trinity Western's motto is Turris Fortis Deus Noster. The Latin motto is translated as "A Mighty Fortress is Our God". The inspiration for the motto came from a famous hymn of the same name written by Martin Luther.

The University's coat of arms was granted by the Royal College of Arms, and was presented to then-university president R. Neil Snider in 1986 by the Lieutenant Governor of B.C. on behalf of Her Majesty Queen Elizabeth II.

A torch symbol is also used prevalently at the university, as the coat of arms is reserved to authenticate the highest official University academic and legal documents.

Spartans is the nickname of the varsity teams that compete for Trinity Western University. The name, which comes from the Ancient Greek civilization of Sparta, originated when the university's first intercollegiate team the men's basketball team, began competing in 1964.

Academic programs
Trinity Western University is an independent, privately supported institution, offering a liberal arts education. Since its founding in 1962, it has identified as a Christian institution, although it has always been governed independently from any church or religious organization. It is currently administered by a 14-member Board of Governors, to which the President reports. Theologian, Dr. Mark Husbands, is the current president effective July 1, 2019.

Undergraduates fulfill general education requirements, choose among a wide variety of elective courses, and pursue departmental concentrations and interdisciplinary certificate programs. Students usually take classes through the university's semester system, with three semesters taking place each year. The fall semester lasts from September to December, and the spring semester from January to April. For students wishing to take classes over summer, the university offers several courses on campus as well as travel studies through its summer semester programming, which runs from May to August.

Graduate students take courses through the Faculty of Graduate Studies and ACTS Seminaries. Master's degree programs are available in the humanities, education, linguistics, psychology, business, nursing, and theology.

The university hosts a number of research institutes and centres, including the Dead Sea Scrolls Institute, Gender Studies Institute, Religion, Culture and Conflict Research Group, Septuagint Institute, Centre for Entrepreneurial Leadership, Centre for Spiritual Formation in Higher Education, Religion in Canada Institute, as well as, the Institute of Indigenous Issues and Perspectives.

Trinity Western's students are from all 10 provinces, 37 U.S. states, and 33 foreign countries. The student body is 72% Canadian, 12% American, and 13% are from overseas. The university employs a faculty of approximately 250 instructors and professors, enabling a student to faculty ratio of 11:1, and an average class size of 25. Over 85% of Trinity Western's professors have doctorates.

Trinity Western University is accredited by the Association of Universities and Colleges of Canada, and is recognized by the U.S. Department of Education. Trinity Western University is a member of the Council for Christian Colleges and Universities. Tuition for the 2014–15 academic year was $22,260 CDN, making tuition the most expensive of any Canadian university. Roughly 95% of Trinity Western's incoming and transfer students receive some financial aid in the form of scholarships or grants not including loans. International students pay the same fees as Canadian students.

Trinity Western University is a member of the Royal Society of Canada, the senior national organization for the promotion of learning and research in Canada.

Undergraduate
Undergraduate degrees awarded by Trinity Western University include the Bachelor of Arts, Bachelor of Fine Arts, Bachelor of Science, Bachelor of Science in Nursing, Bachelor of Business Administration, Bachelor of Education, and Bachelor of Human Kinetics. There is also a Bachelor of Applied Science in Engineering transfer program in collaboration with the University of British Columbia's engineering department. Honours programs are available in a number of majors.

Undergraduate courses in the humanities are traditionally either seminars or lectures held one- or two-times a week with an additional conversation-based seminar called a "discussion group". To graduate, all students must complete a liberal arts core curriculum known as the "University Core", comprising 18 classes of various subjects. Students have a high degree of latitude in creating a self-structured Core, which allows students to study subjects of interest outside their chosen major. Most of the Core classes at Trinity Western are led by a full-time professor (as opposed to a teaching assistant).

Within the 18 classes, students complete a two-semester English language requirement, along with courses from the fine arts, natural sciences, philosophy, history, sociology, and religious studies departments, two courses of interdisciplinary studies, and up to three physical education courses.

In addition to the Core, students are required to complete an academic major. Trinity Western University grants bachelor's degrees in 45 academic majors, and 56 minors, concentrations, or certificates, with over 1,200 courses from which to choose. Students may choose courses from any of the university's faculties or schools:
 Faculty of Humanities and Social Sciences
 Faculty of Natural and Applied Sciences
 School of the Arts, Media + Culture
 School of Business
 School of Human Kinetics
 School of Education
 School of Nursing
 Catholic Pacific College, Trinity Western's constituent Catholic college

Whereas most courses are offered on Trinity Western's main campus in Langley, students may study in Bellingham, Washington; Richmond, British Columbia; or online. Furthermore, many take part in travel studies and exchange programs at partner institutions or universities across the globe. Students are also free to design their own courses with the support of a faculty member or member of the administration.

Graduate
Trinity Western offers 11 programs of graduate studies through its Faculty of Graduate Studies, either in the Langley or Richmond campus:
Master of Arts in Biblical Studies
Master of Business Administration
Master of Science in Nursing
Master of Arts in Counselling Psychology
Master of Arts in Educational Leadership
Master of Arts Linguistics
Master of Arts Educational Studies - Special Education
Master of Arts Interdisciplinary Humanities
Master of Arts in Leadership
Master of Arts in Leadership - Business Stream in Mandarin
Master of Arts TESOL

While the MBA program offers specializations in International Business and Managing a Growing Enterprises, it is also one of only two MBA programs in Canada to offer a non-profit specialization.

The MA Counselling Psychology Program is currently one of only six programs in Canada that is fully accredited by CACEP, a division of the CCPA.

Trinity Western also hosts ACTS Seminaries, a group of seminaries founded when several Christian denominations partnered to establish an institution that would train men and women in the study of theology and for positions as ministers. The following Masters programs are offered through ACTS Seminaries:
Master of Theological Studies
Master of Divinity
Master of Theology
Master of Arts in Marriage and Family Therapy
Master of Arts in Christian Studies
Master of Arts in Linguistics and Translation
Doctor of Ministry

Cancelled Faculty of Law 

In July 2012, the university submitted a proposal to offer a Juris Doctor program. The proposal was put forth to the provincial Ministry of Advanced Education and the Federation of Law Societies of Canada, and was approved in December 2013.

On December 12, 2014, due to the ongoing lawsuits surrounding law societies voting to not automatically accredit TWU law students upon graduation, B.C. Advanced Education Minister Amrik Virk revoked the province's approval of the proposed law school at Trinity Western University. In his letter to the school's administration, he expressed the importance of the legal process and encouraged TWU to re-apply once the court cases have been settled.

Student Life 
In 2011, Trinity Western received an A level rating in The Globe and Mails "Overall Student Satisfaction" category and an A+ rating for its "Sense of Community on Campus". Campus housing is provided to students in all years of study, and all students in their first and second year are required to live on campus in residential halls unless living with family. Third and fourth year students have the option of living off-campus. Trinity Western offers its students nearly 100 organizations, teams, and sports.

Christian Creed and Covenant
The university was founded by a committee commissioned by the Evangelical Free Church of America, a denomination in the Radical Pietistic tradition, to establish a Christian liberal arts college. Accordingly, the committee's mission has shaped the campus and the university. Trinity Western University has maintained extremely close ties with the broader Christian church, and historically has had close relationships with the Evangelical and Mainline Protestant denominations, as well as with the Mennonite tradition recently. This has also resulted in the university having a significant American influence when compared with other Canadian universities. More than one out of every six students is American.

The university previously mandated that all students abide by a code of conduct called the Community Covenant, which was described as "a solemn pledge in which members place themselves under obligations on the part of the institution to its members, the members to the institution, and the members to one another." As of August 2018, students are no longer required to sign the covenant. 

The covenant bans sexual relationships outside of a marriage between a woman and a man, as well as behaviour such as hazing, verbal and physical harassment, dishonesty including plagiarism, theft or destruction of another's property, the use of illegal drugs, consuming alcohol on campus, or consuming pornography. 

A 2015 ruling in the Ontario Superior Court of Justice held that "discrimination inherent in the Community Covenant extends not only to [LGBTQ] persons, but also to women generally; to those persons of any gender who might prefer, for their own purposes, to live in a common law relationship rather than engage in the institution of marriage; and to those persons who have other religious beliefs... Despite some efforts by TWU to contend that the Community Covenant does not operate in a discriminatory fashion, it is self-evident that it does." The court ruling noted that "failure to adhere to the conduct imposed by the Community Covenant, carries with it serious consequences." The covenant mandated "at a minimum, suspension" for "sexual intimacy involving persons of the same sex." The school's board of governors voted on August 9, 2018, to make the Community Covenant optional for current and incoming students, effective at the beginning of the 2018–19 school year. TWU's president at the time, Robert Kuhn (2014–19), said in a statement that the change was so that the university could be "inclusive of all students wishing to learn from a Christian viewpoint and underlying philosophy."

Professors of the university sign a statement of faith annually. This policy has caused some controversy within academic circles, and was most recently covered in Maclean's. As in line with the students, a mixture of Christian traditions are represented. Orthodox and Hebrew professors are also on staff.

Approximately 80% of undergraduates enrolled self-identify as Christian.  There are many Christian clubs, organizations, and ministries on campus. There is no compulsory participation in any religious liturgies. Students and clubs of other religious denominations are welcomed and supported. Nearly every resident hall has a Chaplain in residence. In the morning on every weekday there is Chapel, at which attendance is voluntary, and communion is offered on one Friday each month. Within the university Core, students are required four terms of Religious Studies. One term is allotted to a Survey of the Old Testament, and one to a Survey of the New Testament. Another term must be a class in Religious and Cultural studies.

Catholic Pacific College, formerly Redeemer Pacific College, is the university's constituent Catholic college. CPC's Glover Road Campus is adjacent to TWU. CPC is administered separately of the university, offers classes in Catholic studies and a liberal arts curriculum is taught by a Catholic faculty. Mass is also offered four times weekly.

Student groups

Trinity Western's nearly 100 student organizations and clubs cover a wide range of interests. In 2011, the university hosted 11 academic groups, four cultural groups, five "issue-oriented" groups, eight performing groups, six pre-professional groups, three publications, and 13 recreational groups. Greek life is not sponsored by the university.

Each year, the Foreign Affairs Society hosts a Model United Nations conference for high school students. The Trinity Western University Students Association is the elected government of the student body, and works as an aid and mediator between individual students and university administration, in addition to sponsoring several events throughout the academic year.

Members of the university's chamber choirs are often invited to guest perform with the Vancouver Symphony Orchestra, performances which have been broadcast on a number of occasions on CBC Radio; as well, Trinity Western's choirs have performed frequently with the CBC Radio Orchestra, the Vancouver Chamber Choir, and at venues including Carnegie Hall in New York and frequent performances at the Orpheum, Vancouver, and the Chan Shun Concert Hall.

The university hosts three student publications. Mars' Hill, the student newspaper, is one of the most decorated student newspapers in North America in recent years. Mars' Hill has won the Associated Collegiate Press National Pacemaker Award, considered the Pulitzer Prize of student journalism, for best non-daily newspaper in 2008 and 2010. It was also a finalist in 2006 and 2009. It is a member of the U.S.'s Associated Collegiate Press and Canada's Canadian University Press. [ s p a c e s ], an annual literary journal, is edited and published by students each year, as well as Pillar, the university's yearbook.

Athletics

Since its founding in 1962 Trinity Western has provided athletics for both women and men. Today, the university supports athletics at the varsity, club, and intramural levels. Its colours are gold and blue.

The university sponsors 11 men's and women's varsity sports. Teams compete in Canadian Interuniversity Sport, the top university athletics league in Canada, with teams competing in the Canada West Universities Athletic Association at the regional level. Varsity teams competing in U Sports include men's and women's basketball, soccer, volleyball, track and field, cross country, hockey, and rugby. The basketball, volleyball, and hockey teams play their home games and matches at the Langley Events Centre. Trinity Western teams have won nine U Sports national championships.

International Programs 
Trinity Western's international programs offer students the ability to study all over the world for part of the summer, a semester, or a full year.

The School of Kinesiology has sponsored summer travel studies programs at the 2008 and 2012 Olympic Games in Beijing and in London, respectively. The School of Art, Media + Culture sponsors a summer program in Paris and London, and the School of Business sponsors a summer program in Ottawa and Quebec City. Various other summer programs are offered, such as coral reef biology in Hawaii, Biblical studies in Israel and the West Bank and Johannine literature in Turkey.

Additionally, in conjunction with the CCCU, the university offers 12 semester-long programs through the CCCU's BestSemester initiative. Sponsored programs include African studies in Uganda, filmmaking and film studies in Los Angeles, India studies in Tamil Nadu, Latin American studies in San Jose, Costa Rica, and American studies in Washington, D.C.

Trinity Western's research and exchange partnership with the University of Oxford enables qualifying students to study as a visiting student at Oxford for either a semester or a year. Exchange programs at Spain's University of Salamanca and China's Xiamen University are also available to students. Students may also make their own arrangements with the help of a faculty member to study at other universities in Canada or abroad as visiting students.

Laurentian Leadership Centre 

The Laurentian Leadership Centre certificate program housed in Ottawa's Booth House, a National Historic Site of Canada, offers the opportunity for third- and fourth-year students to complete a fully credited semester of study while interning at Parliament, or a political group, business, media firm, or NGO in the national capital. Internship placements regularly include the Prime Minister's Office; the Ministry of Foreign Affairs; the Ministry of Finance; and the Conservative, Liberal, and New Democratic parties; as well as, the Canadian Council of Chief Executives; Royal Bank's Capital Markets division; CIDA; World Vision; and CPAC. The program is also available to visiting students of other universities.

OMADA Teambuilding 
OMADA Teambuilding is a leadership and team building program housed in the School of Human Kinetics. The program uses experiential education and hands on learning for both TWU students and outside organizations. Started at the university in 1998, the Challenge Course was renamed OMADA Teambuilding in 2009 to better represent the diversity of the programs that were being offered.

Campus
The main campus is located in the rural Township of Langley, British Columbia, occupying  on the edge of historic Fort Langley. Fort Langley, a former fur-trade post of the Hudson's Bay Company, was selected by Governor Sir James Douglas as the provisional capital of the newly established Colony of British Columbia in 1858. There is a residence hall on campus named in honour of Douglas. The campus is situated about 45 minutes southeast from Vancouver and about 2 hours north from Seattle.

Campus buildings vary in age and style from Hanson Chapel, completed in 1962 (the first building completed on campus), to the Skidmore Hall dormitory, completed in 2017. Today the campus consists of 35 buildings and residence halls that house the university's various departments and students.

The architecture on campus is inspired by British Columbia, Rural B.C., and the Pacific Northwest. Modern red brick covers Alloway Library, Larsen Atrium, and Stanley Nelson Student Centre at the main part of campus. Other significant buildings on campus include Robert N. Thompson Building which houses the Political Science, History, English, and Geography departments. The newly built and yet to be named Music Building is home to the School of Art, Media + Culture. The Faculty of Natural and Applied Sciences are housed in the Neufeld Science Centre, which experienced a major renovation in 2011, and the Vernon Stromback Centre at the east end of campus. In total there are 33 buildings on the university campus.

During President Raymond's tenure, the university has built the Music Building in 2010, and in 2011 Fraser Hall and the Neufeld Science Centre received major renovations in 2011. In 2012 the Vernon Strombeck Centre received a significant interior and exterior renovation, and in 2013 the prominent Robert N. Thompson building was re-modeled... In September 2017, Trinity Western opened the first new dormitory in twenty-five years, as a result of rising enrollment.

Cafeteria meals are now served in an all-you-care-to-eat style, and three smaller venues around campus offer additional food services.

Academic facilities

The Norma Marion Alloway Library is the main library for undergraduate students, holding a circulation of over 300,000 books, 12,000 periodical subscriptions, and computer access to thousands more titles. The university archives house several special collections: the Mel Smith Archives, the Robert N. Thompson Archives, and the Lyle Wicks Papers, which chronicle Canada's political history through the works and personal documents of these three political figures. The library also has a Korean collection.

The Faculty of Graduate Studies and seminaries each maintain their own individual libraries.

Wireless internet is available across campus.

Athletic facilities

Rogers Field is located on the northeast edge of campus, and is the home pitch to the women's and men's varsity soccer teams. In 2008 Rogers Field was the host venue as the Spartans women's soccer team won the CIS Championship. It also hosted the men's CIS Championship in 2009.

David E. Enarson Gymnasium has been the university's indoor sports venue since it was built in 1969. In 2009, the newly built Langley Events Centre replaced Enarson as the home of Spartans basketball and volleyball, and replaced George Preston Arena as the home of Spartans hockey. The LEC was the host venue when the Spartans' men's volleyball team won the CIS Championship in 2011. Today, Enarson Gymnasium houses the university's athletic offices and strength and conditioning room, hosts physical education classes and intramurals, and occasionally varsity sports events. It is also the new home court for the Vancouver Dragons of the Minor League Basketball Association.

Tennis courts, an indoor rock wall, and practice fields are also located on campus. Though the university does not sponsor rowing teams, there are rowing facilities on the Fraser River. The cross country and track and field teams train at the Township of Langley's McLeod Athletic Park, the host park of the B.C. high school championships and the 2010 British Columbia Games. The Redwoods and Belmont golf courses are both located minutes from campus.

Satellite campuses

Ottawa - Booth House
 The home of the Laurentian Leadership Centre in Ottawa is the Booth House, an historic mansion in Downtown Ottawa and a National Historic Site of Canada. Built in 1901 as the home of lumber and railway baron John R. Booth, Trinity Western purchased the building in 2000. Located on Metcalfe Street near Somerset, the campus is within minutes of the Parliament of Canada and many important governmental departments and embassies.

The Laurentian Leadership Centre program, an extension of Trinity Western University, offers third and fourth year students, and recent graduates, an opportunity to experience a fully credited semester of study as well as a Parliamentary, communications, business or NGO internship in Canada's national capital, Ottawa, Ontario. Although the program is open to students of any major, it is primarily designed for those who plan a career in political science, business, communications, history or international studies. The program is also open to visiting students from other universities.

The LLC is located a few blocks away from Parliament Hill, Ottawa. The 20 students accepted to the program each semester take three academic courses in: Canadian Governmental Leadership, Ethics & Public Affairs, and Law & Public Policy. Courses are taught both by TWU professors as well as national and international leaders and guest speakers.

The internship program is the distinguishing feature of the Laurentian Leadership Centre. The LLC director places each student in an internship relevant to his or her academic or career interest. Internships fall into a number of categories: government, corporate, media, communications, and non-governmental. Previous internships have included: the Prime Minister's Office (which hosts one intern each semester), foreign embassies, offices of Members of Parliament and Senators, the Ministry of Foreign Affairs, Mitel, World Vision, Make Poverty History, the National Arts Centre, RBC Capital Markets, the Ottawa Citizen newspaper, and a variety of others. Often these internships lead to full-time employment.  Currently, there are several LLC graduates with positions in the PMO as well as in multiple ministries, political parties across Canada, and businesses from finance to high tech.

While participating in the program, students reside in an historic mansion on Metcalfe Street, the famous Booth House, which is designated as a National Historic Site of Canada.

The current director is Dr. Janet Epp Buckingham.

Bellingham
Located very close to the Canadian-U.S. border on the U.S. side, Trinity Western's Bellingham campus provides adult degree completion Bachelor of Arts programs in leadership, psychology and the social sciences. Students meet one night per week and one Saturday per course. Upon completion of each six-week course in succession, students may work to finish their bachelor's degree in as few as 18 months, depending upon the number of credits transferred. TWU Bellingham personalizes evaluation of students' past education and life experiences to recognize the skills and knowledge applied to degree requirements. Classes engage dynamic discussions, are learner-centred and success focused.

Trinity Western's Bellingham campus also hosts the unique Freshman FASTTrack program, a one-year program of liberal arts core courses for new freshman. The program is designed to aid the transition from high school to university, transferring into the four-year college or university of their choice. Subjects are integrated to maximize interdisciplinary learning. Using the cohort model, small classes involve dynamic discussions and are supported with learning coaches. This concentrated immersion style of learning results in students completing a full 31 semester college credits attending morning classes, leaving their afternoons and evenings free to work or study.

Richmond
In his 2008 state of the university address, President Jonathan Raymond announced the grant of a rent-free  space to be used toward university education in Richmond, British Columbia. Opened in 2012, the university's Richmond campus near Vancouver will be used to be the home of TWU-Extension, Trinity Western's effort to help adults past the usual age of university complete their bachelor's degrees.

Controversies and Court Cases
In November 2016 The Province reported on the school's acceptance or lack thereof of LGBTQ students. According to the story, gay students were subjected to a culture of shame.

Teaching certification program accreditation lawsuit

In 1995, Trinity Western launched a teaching certification program, but the British Columbia College of Teachers denied accreditation of the university's program, arguing that the "Responsibilities of Membership" agreement students must sign (replaced in 2009 with the Community Covenant) is discriminatory and that those graduating from Trinity Western's program will discriminate against gay students. The lower courts in British Columbia and, later, the Supreme Court of Canada, ruled in favour of Trinity Western University, stating that there was no basis for the BCCT's decision, and, moreover, that "the concern that graduates of TWU will act in a detrimental fashion in the classroom is not supported by any evidence".

The final analysis of the case, as reported by the Factum of the Intervener, the B.C. Civil Liberties Association, was that "In the circumstances of this case the Council of the B.C. College of Teachers failed to conduct such an enquiry and erroneously concluded that equality of rights on the basis of sexual orientation trump freedom of religion and association. They do not."

Faculty of Law accreditation lawsuits
Automatic accreditation of graduates from TWU's proposed faculty of law were approved by most of the provincial law societies across Canada in 2014, except the Law Society of Upper Canada (now the Law Society of Ontario) and the Nova Scotia Barristers' Society.

Law Society of British Columbia Accreditation Reversal 
On June 11, 2014, 3,210 of the Law Society of British Columbia's 13,000 members voted in support of a resolution to reverse its decision to grant the faculty accreditation and requested that the province revoke its accreditation of the law program because of the view that it discriminates against unmarried couples and homosexual individuals. 968 members voted against with 8,822 not registering a vote. On September 26, 2014, the governing members of the Law Society decided to hold a binding referendum of their membership to determine whether to revoke Trinity Western's accreditation. Just over 8,000 BC lawyers voted in the referendum, with 74% voting in favour of a resolution declaring that the proposed law school at TWU would not be an approved Faculty of Law for the Law Society's admission program. Voter turnout was just under 60%.

Nova Scotia: Trinity Western University v Nova Scotia Barristers' Society 
The case was brought before the Nova Scotia Supreme Court from December 16-19, 2014. Trinity Western argued that denying automatic accreditation to TWU law graduates is an infringement on the students' right to freedom of religion. 

The Court ruled in favour of TWU on January 28, 2015, accepting the argument that, as a private religious university, the school had the right to uphold its own code of conduct "even if the effect of that code is to exclude... or offend others" and attempting to force TWU to change its community covenant was an infringement on religious freedom. The ruling further noted that the Nova Scotia Barristers' Society already requires all lawyers to follow its Code of Professional Conduct, which forbids all discrimination, so the Community Covenant would not affect TWU graduates in their practice of law. 

The NSBS appealed to the Nova Scotia Court of Appeal. The Court of Appeal heard the appeal in April 2016, and upheld the Nova Scotia Supreme Court's ruling on July 26, 2016.

Ontario: Trinity Western University v The Law Society of Upper Canada 
The case was brought before the Divisional Court of the Ontario Superior Court of Justice from June 1-4, 2015. Trinity Western argued that their proposed law school's graduates should not be refused automatic accreditation in Ontario by the Law Society of Upper Canada based on the Community Covenant Agreement, claiming that the decision would violate TWU students' rights to freedom of religion, freedom of expression, and freedom of association.

The Court ruled in favour of the LSUC on July 2, 2015, stating that its refusal to automatically accredit TWU graduates was a reasonable balancing of the Charter rights to equality and freedom of religion, and that the refusal of automatic accreditation was not a violation of TWU students' rights to freedom of expression or freedom of association. The ruling further noted that TWU graduates are free to apply independently to the LSUC for accreditation following their graduation. 

TWU filed a motion to appeal with the Court of Appeal for Ontario in September 2015, and the Court of Appeal upheld the ruling in favour of LSUC on June 29, 2016.

British Columbia: Trinity Western University v Law Society of British Columbia 
The case was brought before the Supreme Court of British Columbia from August 24-26, 2015. The Law Society of British Columbia had argued that TWU forcing students to sign the "Community Covenant" creates an unwelcome atmosphere for LGBTQ students and, given the high levels of competition for law school seats in Canada, would effectively create a two-tier system in which LGBTQ individuals would not have equal access to limited law school spaces.

The Court ruled in favour of TWU on December 10, 2015, overturning the LSBC's decision against accrediting the TWU law school and stating the LSBC did not "attempt to resolve the collision of the competing Charter interests [of equality before the law and freedom of religion]." 

The LSBC filed an appeal of the decision with the British Columbia Court of Appeal on January 5, 2016, which was heard June 1-3, 2016. On November 1, 2016, the Court of Appeal upheld the previous decision, stating that LSBC's refusal of accreditation was unreasonable.

Supreme Court of Canada Decisions 
Both the Ontario and B.C. rulings were appealed to the Supreme Court of Canada, the cases appeared on November 30 and December 1, 2017, respectively. On June 15, 2018, the Supreme Court, across four sets of reasons, ruled in favour of the law societies in 7-2 for both Trinity Western University v Law Society of Upper Canada and Law Society of British Columbia v Trinity Western University. 

The majority decisions said that TWU's Community Covenant would deter LGBT students from attending the proposed law school and that equal access to legal education, diversity in the legal profession and preventing harm to LGBT students was in the public interest.

Notable alumni and faculty

References

External links

 
Trinity Western University page at the Association of Universities and Colleges of Canada

 
Council for Christian Colleges and Universities
Educational institutions established in 1962
Evangelical universities and colleges in Canada
Langley, British Columbia (district municipality)
Liberal arts colleges
Universities and colleges affiliated with the Evangelical Free Church of America
Universities and colleges in Bellingham, Washington
Universities in British Columbia
Private universities and colleges in Canada
1962 establishments in British Columbia
Christian universities and colleges in Canada